Solís Chico Creek is a Uruguayan stream, crossing Canelones Department. It flows into the Río de la Plata, between Parque del Plata and Las Vegas. It is named after Spanish explorer Juan Díaz de Solís.

See also
List of rivers of Uruguay

References

Rivers of Uruguay
Rivers of Canelones Department